Ralph Edward Goodale  (born October 5, 1949) is a Canadian diplomat and retired politician who has served as the Canadian High Commissioner to the United Kingdom since April 19, 2021.

Goodale was first elected in 1974 as the member of Parliament (MP) for Assiniboia, as a member of the Liberal Party. He was defeated in 1979, and moved into provincial Saskatchewan politics, serving as leader of the Saskatchewan Liberals from 1981 to 1988. He returned to federal politics in 1993, as the MP for Regina—Wascana (known simply as Wascana from 1997 to 2015), and served in the governments of Jean Chrétien, Paul Martin and Justin Trudeau, in several roles including as minister of finance and minister of public safety.

Early life
Goodale was born in Regina, Saskatchewan and raised on a farm near Wilcox, Saskatchewan, the son of Winnifred Claire (Myers) and Thomas Henry Goodale. He was a member of Scouts Canada and earned the rank of Queen's Scout. He first attended the University of Saskatchewan, Regina Campus and then obtained a law degree from the University of Saskatchewan in Saskatoon, where he was awarded the Gold Medal for academic achievement.

Federal politics, 1974–1979
Active at politics from a young age, he was first elected to the Parliament of Canada in the 1974 election at the age of 24 from the seat of Assiniboia. He defeated New Democratic Party (NDP) incumbent Bill Knight. He served as a backbench supporter of Prime Minister Pierre Trudeau's government until the 1979 election, when he was defeated, coming in third behind winning Progressive Conservative Leonard Gustafson and Knight.

Provincial politics
In 1981, Goodale was named leader of the Saskatchewan Liberal Party. He led that party to a very poor showing in the 1982 provincial election, in which the party received 4.51% of the popular vote and won no seats in the provincial legislature. However, Goodale was the only Liberal candidate to receive more than 1,000 votes; he won 2,760 in Assiniboia-Gravelbourg and lost narrowly to incumbent Allen Engel.

The party won 9.99% of the vote in the 1986 provincial election, but only Goodale was elected to the legislature, defeating Engel in a rematch. Goodale ran on a platform of fiscal responsibility in this election, arguing that both the Progressive Conservative and New Democratic parties favoured excessive spending policies, typified by their proposals for a Keynesian-style stimulation of the provincial economy through subsidized home improvement and renovation schemes.

Return to federal politics

Defeated in 1988 election
Goodale resigned as leader to run for the federal Liberals in the 1988 election for the seat of Regina—Wascana. He lost narrowly to former Regina mayor Larry Schneider, who later went on to serve briefly in Kim Campbell's cabinet. Beginning earlier that year and prior to his resignation, Goodale's executive assistant was Jason Kenney. Kenney would become a Conservative Party of Canada MP in Calgary ridings Calgary Southeast and Calgary Midnapore (1997–2016) and later Premier of Alberta (since 2019).

Goodale then spent five years in the private sector, working for companies such as the Pioneer Life Assurance Company, Pioneer Lifeco Inc., and Sovereign Life Insurance Co.; he has stated in interviews that he felt his political career had ended.

In government, 1993–2006

Goodale contested Regina—Wascana again in the 1993 federal election and was elected as part of the Liberal landslide that year. As a member of the new Chrétien cabinet, Goodale was named Minister of Agriculture and Agri-Food. He has the prenominal "the Honourable" and the postnominal "PC" for life by virtue of being made a member of the Queen's Privy Council for Canada on November 4, 1993. He was reelected for this riding, known as Wascana from 1997 to 2015, in the next seven federal elections.

In 1997, he became the Minister of Natural Resources. In May 2002, he was named Minister of Public Works and Government Services, a few weeks after the Auditor General Sheila Fraser issued a report accusing the department of inappropriate contracting practices. This began the exposure of the Sponsorship scandal.

A close ally of Paul Martin, Goodale was appointed to the senior portfolio of Finance Minister when Martin became Prime Minister on December 12, 2003. In that capacity he tabled two consecutive balanced budgets and launched the Government's productivity agenda.

On December 28, 2005, a letter surfaced from Royal Canadian Mounted Police (RCMP) Commissioner Giuliano Zaccardelli confirming the force was launching a criminal investigation into whether details regarding government tax policies relating to income trust funds were leaked from the Finance Minister's office. Goodale said he would co-operate completely with any investigation, but would not step aside while the RCMP continued their probe. The investigation dealt only with the Department of Finance, and not the minister himself. On February 15, 2007 the RCMP announced the conclusion of the income trust investigation and laid a charge of 'Breach of Trust' against Serge Nadeau, an official in the Department of Finance, who pleaded guilty in 2010. Goodale was cleared of any wrongdoing, and blamed the NDP's Judy Wasylycia-Leis for sabotaging the Liberals in the 2006 election.

In opposition, 2006–2015
Goodale was re-elected to the House of Commons in the general election on January 23, 2006, but the Conservatives won government and he lost his cabinet position. He was named Opposition House Leader by interim Liberal leader Bill Graham in 2006, and continued to serve in this role under the leaderships of Stéphane Dion and Michael Ignatieff until September 2010 when he was promoted to Deputy Leader.

2006 Liberal Party leadership election
After the Liberals' defeat and Paul Martin's election-night announcement that he would resign as party leader, Goodale initially indicated that he was not interested in succeeding Martin in that post. "I do not anticipate ever having to cross that bridge," he said. "I rule it out." On March 13, 2006, the Toronto Star reported that Goodale was reconsidering his decision, and stated that he may enter the Liberal leadership election after all. In the end, he declined, citing his inability to speak French as a key reason. On November 28, 2006, he endorsed Bob Rae to be the next leader of the Liberal Party. After the third ballot, Bob Rae, who finished third, was eliminated. Goodale then endorsed Stéphane Dion, the eventual winner.

Goodale was opposed to David Orchard's candidacy in the by-election for Desnethé—Missinippi—Churchill River. Dion terminated the nomination contest and appointed Joan Beatty as the candidate.

Proposed coalition government, 2008
Goodale was re-elected once more in the fall of 2008. One month later, in November 2008, the Liberals and their fellow opposition parties in the Canadian parliament, the NDP and Bloc Québécois, indicated their intention to defeat Stephen Harper's Conservative government in a motion of no confidence, and expressed their desire for Governor General Michaëlle Jean to ask a member of the opposition to form a new government. While there was initially some speculation that Goodale would become Prime Minister of Canada as leader of the proposed coalition government, the coalition agreement simply made "the leader of the Liberal Party" Prime Minister. The Liberals agreed shortly after that Stéphane Dion would lead the government on an interim basis until a new Liberal leader was chosen. In the end, at Prime Minister Harper's request, Jean prorogued Parliament before a confidence vote could be put to the House. By the time Parliament resumed in January 2009, Michael Ignatieff had become interim leader of the party. He did not seek to bring down the government and agreed to support Harper's budget with amendments.

2011 election
Goodale was one of the 34 Liberal MPs who was returned in the 2011 federal election, the Liberal Party of Canada's worst-ever electoral performance. He and Kevin Lamoureux of Winnipeg North in Winnipeg, Manitoba, were the only two Liberal MPs elected from the Prairie provinces.

The NDP surpassed the Liberals in number of seats, becoming the official opposition, resulted in priority in choosing parliamentary offices. They requested that Goodale forfeit his suite in the coveted Central Block. The Liberals saw this as a measure of disrespect to Goodale, noting that he had seniority as a former cabinet minister and house leader, despite this being standard practice and noting the Conservatives had not asked any Liberals to give up their offices.

In government, 2015–2019
The Liberals won a majority government in the 2015 federal election, and Goodale was re-elected to a ninth term in the House of Commons, once again representing Regina—Wascana as a consequence of redistricting. In his first cabinet, the new prime minister Justin Trudeau named Goodale to be Minister of Public Safety and Emergency Preparedness. He was the only MP to serve in government with both Pierre and Justin Trudeau. An order in council on November 4, 2015, placed Goodale as first in line to assume the prime minister's powers and duties as acting prime minister, should Prime Minister Justin Trudeau become incapacitated. Trudeau did not appoint a deputy prime minister at that time.

Goodale sought re-election in the 2019 federal election, but lost his bid to Conservative Party candidate Michael Kram in a rematch of the 2015 race. Despite having represented the riding since 1993, Goodale was defeated by more than 16 percentage points.

Post-politics
On March 31, 2020, Prime Minister Justin Trudeau announced the appointment of Goodale as Special Advisor to the Government of Canada's response to Ukraine International Airlines Flight 752 crash. Goodale will "examine lessons learned" from Ukraine International Airlines Flight 752, Ethiopian Airlines Flight 302, Air India Flight 182 and other air disasters and "develop a framework to guide Canada's responses to international air disasters."

Diplomatic career 

Goodale was appointed the Canadian High Commissioner to the United Kingdom on April 13, 2021, replacing Janice Charette, who was appointed the interim clerk of the Privy Council. Goodale's priorities in the position will include "working with the U.K. on climate change and the recovery from the COVID-19 pandemic" as well as replacing the "transitional trade agreement with a permanent deal in the wake of Brexit".

Reactions to appointment 
The appointment drew praise from Saskatchewan premier Scott Moe, who called the appointment "well deserved" and stating Goodale will be "a real advocate and a great representative for the nation and Canada, but he’ll also be, in many ways, a great representative for the province of Saskatchewan", as well as Conservative foreign affairs critic Michael Chong, who said Goodale "brings a lot of experience to the job".

Electoral record

Regina—Wascana

Assiniboia-Gravelbourg

|-

|- bgcolor="white"
!align="left" colspan=3|Total
!align="right"|7,914
!align="right"|100.00
!align="right"|

|-

|- bgcolor="white"
!align="left" colspan=3|Total
!align="right"|8,532
!align="right"|
!align="right"|

Assiniboia

Honours

Commonwealth honours
 Commonwealth honours

References

External links

1949 births
Canadian Ministers of Finance
Commission for Africa members
Lawyers in Saskatchewan
Liberal Party of Canada MPs
Living people
Members of the 26th Canadian Ministry
Members of the 27th Canadian Ministry
Members of the 29th Canadian Ministry
Members of the House of Commons of Canada from Saskatchewan
Members of the King's Privy Council for Canada
Mining ministers of Canada
Politicians from Regina, Saskatchewan
Saskatchewan Liberal Party MLAs
University of Saskatchewan alumni
University of Saskatchewan College of Law alumni
Leaders of the Saskatchewan Liberal Party